Turuntayevo is the name of several rural localities in Russia:
Turuntayevo, Republic of Buryatia, a selo in Turuntayevsky Selsoviet of Pribaykalsky District of the Republic of Buryatia
Turuntayevo, Tomsk Oblast, a selo in Tomsky District of Tomsk Oblast